The Principality of Khachen was a medieval Armenian principality on the territory of historical Artsakh (present-day Nagorno-Karabakh). The provinces of Artsakh and Utik were attached to the Kingdom of Armenia in antiquity. In the early medieval period, these provinces were under Sassanid or Arab suzerainty until the establishment of the Bagratid Kingdom of Armenia in the 9th century. From the 12th century the Armenian Principality of Khachen dominated the region. The Byzantine emperor Constantine VII addressed his letters to the prince of Khachen with the inscription "To Prince of Khachen, Armenia."

According to Abū Dulaf, an Arab traveller of the time, Khachen was an Armenian principality immediately south of Barda'a (modern-day Barda, Azerbaijan). The Armenian princely family of Hasan Jalalyan began ruling much of Khachen and Artsakh in 1214. In 1216, the Jalalyans founded the Gandzasar monastery which became the seat of the Armenian Apostolic Catholicos of Albania, forced to Khachen from Partav (Barda) by the steady Islamization of the city. The Khamsa (The Five) principalities maintained Armenian autonomy in the region throughout the Persian-Ottoman Wars. In 1603 the Persians established a protectorate over the Khamsa and sponsored the establishment of a Karabakh Khanate in 1750.

The name Khamsa, which was used by Arabs for the state, refers to the five Armenian Melikdoms who ruled the state.

See also 
 House of Hasan-Jalalyan
 History of Nagorno-Karabakh
 Artsakh (disambiguation)
 Karabakh
 Armenia
 Republic of Artsakh

References

External links 
Gandzasar.com: Gandzasar Monastery, Nagorno Karabakh Republic
cilicia.com